USS Somers may refer to:

 , was a schooner that fought on Lake Erie and Huron during the War of 1812. She was captured by the British in 1814.
 , was a brig launched in 1842 and sunk in 1846. The ship is known for the Somers Affair.
 , was a torpedo boat purchased in 1898 and sold in 1920
 , was a  launched in 1918 , commissioned in 1920 and scrapped in 1931
 , was a  launched , commissioned in 1937 and scrapped in 1947
 , was a  launched in 1958 , commissioned in 1959 and sunk as target in 1998

See also
 Master Commandant Richard Somers, a U.S. Navy officer killed in a daring assault during the First Barbary War

United States Navy ship names